The Bradley Building is a mid rise building in Cleveland, Ohio. Completed in 1887 by Cudell & Richardson, the building has eight stories and rises to a height of 128 feet, and is a product of the Chicago school of architecture. It is most notable for being the first building between New York and Chicago to be designated for multi-use. The building has since served as a model for the conversion of historic buildings throughout the city. In 1980, it was added to the National Register of Historic Places. It was originally named the Root-McBride Building, but was later renamed the Bradley Building.

References

External links
 The Bradley Building - Bradley Associates

Buildings and structures in Cleveland
Commercial buildings on the National Register of Historic Places in Ohio
National Register of Historic Places in Cleveland, Ohio
Buildings and structures completed in 1887
Chicago school architecture in Ohio